The 2012 World Women's Curling Championship (branded as Ford World Women's Curling Championship 2012 for sponsorship reasons) was held at the Enmax Centre in Lethbridge, Alberta from March 17 to 25. It marked the 12th time that Canada has hosted the World Women's Curling Championship. The 2012 World Women's Championship was one of the curling events that is a qualifier for the curling tournament at the 2014 Winter Olympics.

This edition of the World Women's Championship saw the first team from South Korea advancing to the playoffs in history. Previously, their best performance was in 2009, where they finished the round robin in tenth place with a 3–8 win–loss record.

In the final, Switzerland's Mirjam Ott defeated Sweden's Margaretha Sigfridsson after scoring a deuce in the tenth end, wrapping up the game with a score of 7–6. Switzerland won its third gold medal, its first since 1983, when Erika Müller won the world championship. Ott won her first gold medal, while Sigfridsson won her third silver medal.

Scottish skip Eve Muirhead was awarded the Frances Brodie Award, an honour given to a curler at the championships who best exemplified sportsmanship, fair play, honesty, and friendship. Muirhead was nominated by fellow curlers at the championships.

Qualification
The following nations qualified to participate in the 2012 Ford World Women's Curling Championship:
 (host country)
One team from the North American zone

Eight teams from the 2011 European Curling Championships
 

 (Winner of World Challenge Games)
Two teams from the 2011 Pacific-Asia Curling Championships:

Teams
The teams are listed as follows:

*The team's normal skip, Andrea Schöpp, withdrew from the world championships due to a leg injury sustained prior to the championships. Melanie Robillard replaced Schöpp as skip, and threw third stones.

Round-robin standings
Final round-robin standings

Round-robin results
All times are listed in Mountain Standard Time (UTC-7).

Draw 1
Saturday, March 17, 2:00 pm

Draw 2
Saturday, March 17, 7:00 pm

Draw 3
Sunday, March 18, 9:00 am

Draw 4
Sunday, March 18, 2:30 pm

Draw 5
Sunday, March 18, 7:30 pm

Draw 6
Monday, March 19, 9:00 am

Draw 7
Monday, March 19, 2:00 pm

Draw 8
Monday, March 19, 7:00 pm

Draw 9
Tuesday, March 20, 9:00 am

Draw 10
Tuesday, March 20, 2:00 pm

Draw 11
Tuesday, March 20, 8:00 pm

Draw 12
Wednesday, March 21, 9:00 am

Draw 13
Wednesday, March 21, 2:00 pm

Draw 14
Wednesday, March 21, 7:00 pm

Draw 15
Thursday, March 22, 9:00 am

Draw 16
Thursday, March 22, 2:00 pm

Draw 17
Thursday, March 22, 7:00 pm

Tiebreaker
Friday, March 23, 2:00 pm

Playoffs

1 vs. 2
Friday, March 23, 7:00 pm

3 vs. 4
Saturday, March 24, 1:00 pm

Semifinal
Saturday, March 24, 6:00 pm

Bronze medal game
Sunday, March 25, 9:00 am

Gold medal game
Sunday, March 25, 4:30 pm

Top 5 player percentages

References
General

Specific

External links

World Women's Curling Championship
Ford World Women's Curling Championship
Sport in Lethbridge
Qualification events for the 2014 Winter Olympics
Curling competitions in Alberta
World Championship
World Curling Championship
World Women's Curling Championship
Women's curling competitions in Canada
World Women's Curling Championship